The Papillion-La Vista School District is headquartered in Papillion, Nebraska, United States.  The district covers  most of Papillion, almost all of La Vista, and small portions of Bellevue, Chalco, and Offutt AFB. The district was originally established as the Papillion School District, but with the rapid growth of La Vista (incorporated in 1960), the name of the city was officially added to the school district's name in 1987 by former Superintendent Roger Miller.

The school district serves over 12,000 students. The district has two high schools (Papillion-La Vista South High School and Papillion La Vista Senior High School). It is also home to three junior high schools (Papillion Junior High, La Vista Junior High, and Liberty Middle School). Most students from Papillion Junior High graduate to Papillion-La Vista South High School, while students from La Vista Junior High move on to attend Papillion-La Vista Senior High School.  Papillion La Vista Senior High School is sometimes referred to as "North", even though the word "north" is not in its name. Liberty Middle School was opened in 2016 as a means to ease the over-enrolling of students in the other two middle schools and has a mixture of students who would have gone to either of the two middle schools. 

There are ten elementary schools in Papillion: Ashbury, Bell, Carriage Hill, Hickory Hill, Patriot, Prairie Queen, Rumsey Station, Tara Heights, Trumble Park, and Walnut Creek. Four elementary schools in La Vista: G. Stanley Hall, La Vista West, Parkview Heights, and Portal. And Two elementary schools in Bellevue: Anderson Grove and Golden Hills.

Superintendent
Superintendent Rick Black, who began in 2007, announced his retirement at the end of the 2012–2013 school year. The current superintendent is Andrew Rikli, who began on July 1, 2013.

References

External links
 

School districts in Nebraska
Education in Sarpy County, Nebraska
School districts established in 1987
1987 establishments in Nebraska